The Ukrainian Levkoy is a cat breed of distinct appearance, having inward-folding ears and little to no hair. These cats are of medium size with a longish body, appearing both muscular and slender. They have soft, elastic skin; an excess of which leads to a wrinkled appearance.  The breed is not recognized by any major, international cat fancier and breeder organizations, only Ukrainian and Russian clubs.

The Levkoy's peculiar features are: special angular contour of its head and "stepped" profile (dog-face appearance), folded ears and large, but not wide almond-shaped eyes. The cats express sexual dimorphism.

Origin
The Ukrainian Levkoy is recent man-made breed (2000–2011), originally developed by Elena Biriukova in Ukraine. Created by crossing or by outbreeding hairless Donskoy females with Scottish Fold males, the Ukrainian Levkoy has a distinct and unique appearance. Two spontaneous mutations of dominant FD genes of cats with folded ears (that appeared in a simple domestic cat in Scotland) were used, as well as a spontaneous natural dominant mutation of hairlessness or baldness of the domestic cat gene BD in Russia. Both had appeared in the last century in Scotland and in Russia. Oriental and Domestic cats were also used in mating to obtain the required individual characteristics of the Ukrainian Levkoy. The breed was recognized in 2005 in Ukraine by ICFA RUI (Rolandus Union International). It was recognized in Russia in 2010 by ICFA WCA. In Ukraine, starting in September 2010, it was deemed that Ukrainian Levkoys may be awarded the title of "Champion" and that they may take part in "The Best in Show" competition. Nowadays there are 10 Ukrainian Levkoys who are given these titles. In Russia the first titles of "Champion" and "The Best in Show" were given in 2011. The other organizations are mating this new breed of Ukrainian Levkoy as an experimental breed without the "Champion" title at cats exhibitions.

Personality
Ukrainian Levkoys are friendly, playful, and intelligent cats. Levkoys are very sociable, enjoying human or family company as well as the company of other domestic pets (e.g., dogs, rats, pigs). Unclothed Ukrainian Levkoys do not need brushing but do need special skin care to give protection against direct sun and particularly cold conditions.

Development and appearance
From the top view the head of a Ukrainian Levkoy resembles a soft outlined pentagon that is a little longer than it is broad, where the muzzle length is only 1/3 the length of the head. The forehead is rather low and the skull is long and flat. Prominent cheekbones and eyebrows form angular outlines of the head. The profile of the cat head is "stepped" of two levels. The upper lines of the nose bridge and of the head are almost parallel. The whiskers are curly, may be shortly snapped, and then the neck is of medium length, muscular, and slightly arches from the shoulder to the base of the skull.

Its body is medium to long, muscular, and slender. The back line slightly arched with a broad, oval chest. Its legs are rather long with long mobile toes.  The ears are large and set high and wide apart. 1/2 to 1/3 of each ear is roundly folded forward and down, without touching the head.

Defects and disqualification
Gene FD is evident in the organism of the cat in homozygous, both parents may serve as provocation of bones illness such arthritis or the others bones mistakes.

Disqualification results due to defects of the born structures, or crossed eyes. Other disqualify in accordance with the show rules. For example, too short or round of a head, round eyes, short "cobby" body, weak chin, or stressful behavior.

Litter

The average litter size is generally three to five kittens.

Notes

References

External links
 The International Cat Fanciers' Association, Inc. Rolandus Union International (ICFA RUI, Ukraine)
 The Catteries Union of hairless (naked) fold (lop-eared) cats of Ukrainian Levkoy breed
 
 

Cat breeds
Cat breeds originating in Ukraine
Cat breeds and types with bent ears
Hairless cat breeds
Experimental cat breeds